.gl is the country code top-level domain (ccTLD) in the Domain Name System of the Internet for Greenland. The domain is available for Internet services worldwide and registrations are handled by ICANN-accredited domain name registrars.

The domain name has sometimes been marketed as standing for "good luck", "graphics library" or Gloucestershire.

In December 2009, Google released a URL shortener service using the domain hack goo.gl. The service was shut down on 30 March 2019.

In April 2013, the registry unilaterally voluntarily suspended resolution of thepiratebay.gl, intended to be a new primary domain name for Bittorrent search engine The Pirate Bay.

See also
.dk
.eu
.fo

References

External links
 IANA .gl whois information

Country code top-level domains
Communications in Greenland